The 1996–97 NCAA Division I men's basketball rankings was made up of two human polls, the AP Poll and the Coaches Poll, in addition to various other preseason polls.

Legend

AP Poll 
After Cincinnati sat atop the poll for the initial three releases, Kansas assumed the top spot in the poll for the remainder of the season. Arizona, ranked number 15 in the final poll (released on March 10), became the first team to defeat three #1 seeds – Kansas, North Carolina, and Kentucky – en route to winning the NCAA Tournament.

Coaches Poll

References 

1996-97 NCAA Division I men's basketball rankings
College men's basketball rankings in the United States